Palenciana is a city located in the province of Córdoba, Spain. According to the 2006 census (INE), the city has a population of 1584 inhabitants.

References

External links
Palenciana - Sistema de Información Multiterritorial de Andalucía

Municipalities in the Province of Córdoba (Spain)